Tomb of  Mahmut Hayrani is in Akşehir, Konya Province, Turkey.

Seyh Mahmut Hayrani 
Seyh Mahmud was a Sufi mystic and a follower of Mevlana (Rumi). He was born in Harran, what is now a village of Şanlıurfa Province, Turkey. He travelled to Konya and met with Mevlana. Famous satirical figure Nasreddin Hoca was probably a follower of Seyh Mahmut.

The tomb 
There is also a mescit (small mosque) known as Ferruhşah Mosque, next to the tomb. The mescit was the temporary prison reserved for Ottoman sultan Beyazit I after his defeat in the Battle of Ankara in 1402.
While the Ottoman Empire was engaged in interregnum following the defeat, Akşehir was incorporated into Karamanid realm and Mehmet II of Karaman rebuilt the tomb in 1409.

Technical details
The lower stage of the tomb is square, the upper stage is cylindrical and the roof conical. The interior of the tomb is decorated by turquoise stars and hexagonal patterns.

Important Note : Without any family map/shajra or paternal direct descendant proof we cannot call him a sayid which Wikipedia highly require for confirmation.

There were four wooden coffins of high artistic value in the tomb. These coffins were stolen in 1976. One of the coffins is now in the David Samling Museum in Copenhagen, Denmark. Two others were confiscated before they were sent out of Turkey. They are now in Turkish and Islamic Arts Museum in İstanbul.

References

Buildings and structures in Konya Province
Islamic architecture
Karamanids
Tombs in Turkey